Fusarium oxysporum f.sp. citri is a fungus which reproduces by cell fission. It is a well known plant pathogen infecting citruses.

References

oxysporum f.sp. citri
Fungal citrus diseases
Forma specialis taxa